Tigrioides soror is a moth in the family Erebidae. It was described by Schaus in 1922. It is found on Java.

References

Natural History Museum Lepidoptera generic names catalog

Moths described in 1922
Lithosiina